An ice cream sandwich is a frozen dessert consisting of ice cream between two biscuits, skins, wafers, or cookies. The ingredients are different around the world, with Ireland using wafers, and North America using chocolate cookies.

Regional varieties

Australia
Within Australia, popular brands are "Giant Sandwich" (blue and pink wrapper), and "Monaco Bar" (gold and black metallic wrapper) in the Eastern provinces. Other brands include Streets "Cookie", "Maxibon" (with one-half ice cream sandwich) and "Maxibon Cookie", and "Pat and Stick's Homemade Range" (recognizable by its circular shape). Additional brands "Indulge" and "Feast" have also become popular.

Ice cream sandwiches were formerly known as a "cream between". One purchased a small block of ice cream wrapped in paper and placed it between two wafers.

Germany 
In Germany, ice cream sandwiches are made with two wafers and the three flavour combination called Fürst-Pückler-Eis, elsewhere known as Neapolitan ice cream. It is based on a recipe introduced in 1839 by the cook of a German nobleman, Prince Hermann Ludwig Heinrich von Pückler-Muskau.

Iran

The usual Iranian ice cream sandwich is called bastani naani meaning "bread-ice cream", and is made with Iranian traditional ice cream between two wafers.

Ireland 

In Ireland, they are known as "sliders" or an ice cream wafer;  they are usually served as vanilla ice cream sandwiched between two rectangular chocolate wafers. A "double nougat" is ice cream sandwiched between two nougat wafers. The wafers are not covered in chocolate, only the edges.

Israel
In Israel, ice cream sandwiches are commonly known as "kasata" (קסטה). Though the name comes from the Italian cassata, the dessert itself has little to do with Italian cassata, and usually consists of two thick biscuits holding a mix of block of vanilla and chocolate-flavoured ice cream.

North America
The earliest mention of ice cream sandwiches in North America come in the year of 1899. Street vendors in New York recently sold slabs of ice cream between sheets of paper, called "hokey pokeys", until someone had the idea of using cookies instead. Photos from the Jersey Shore circa 1905 show ice cream sandwiches being sold at 1¢ each. The earliest US patent having to do with ice cream sandwiches (No. 1,387,613) is by Russell H. Proper for an "Ice Cream Sandwich Machine" in 1921.  A Chipwich, where ice cream (usually vanilla) is sandwiched between two chocolate chip cookies, is also popular.

A "National Ice Cream Sandwich Day" is set for August 2 and has been celebrated since at least 2005.

Philippines

Local ice cream (sorbetes) sellers/peddlers with their pushcarts that travel around cities sometimes offer ice cream sandwiches with pandesal as the bread.

Singapore
Wafer ice cream is popular in Singapore.  It is one of the types of potong (cut) ice cream, so named because the servings are sliced from a large bar of ice cream.  Wafer ice cream consists of two wafers holding together a rectangular block of ice cream. Wafer ice cream evolved from the older 'ice potong' type, which is a rectangular prism of ice cream mounted on a wooden stick.  Many customers complained that the ice potong would easily melt and fall off the stick, leading to the introduction of the wafers for better grip.  Vendors are commonly found along Orchard Road and Chinatown and outside schools. A colloquial term for it is "pia ice cream", which translates to "biscuit ice cream" in the Hokkien dialect.

Common flavours offered include peppermint, chocolate chip, durian, ripple, red bean, yam, sweet corn,  honeydew, and chocolate.

Wafer ice cream vendors also sell the same blocks of ice cream on slices of multicoloured bread, on cones or in cups instead of sandwiched between wafers.

Catering companies in Singapore also send ice cream sandwich carts for functions.

Thailand
Itim Khanom Pang (or Icecream Khanom Pang), literally bread ice cream, a street food in Thailand usually composed of longer rolls similar to hot dog buns a mix of scoops of coconut ice cream/sorbet (or vanilla) and chocolate-flavoured ice cream, with a selection of local toppings from traditionally salty or sweet sticky rice, salty crushed peanuts, and syrup-soaked chewy palm seeds to slivers of fresh or dried fruits. Then drizzled on top with evaporated milk, sweetened condensed milk or chocolate syrup.

United Kingdom
In the United Kingdom, an ice cream wafer, consisting of a small block of ice cream between two rectangular wafer biscuits, was a popular alternative to a cone up until the 1980s. A "nougat wafer" was also available, consisting of a layer of mallow sandwiched between two wafers and coated with chocolate around the edges. Typically a vanilla block (or a layer of soft-serve) sandwiched between one plain wafer and one chocolate-covered nougat one. This is known as a single nougat" in Scotland, with a double nougat (pronounced nugget) having nougat wafers on both sides.  Raspberry sauce is also a common topping.  Nougat wafers came in double or triple varieties, depending on the number of nougat wafers in the construction.

Uruguay
In Uruguay, an ice cream sandwich (sánguche helado) or triple sandwich (sánguche triple) is typically a neapolitan ice cream (helado triple) sandwich prepared with wafers such as the one in the image.

Vietnam
In Vietnam, an ice cream sandwich called  is commonly sold on the street as a snack.

See also
 Sandwich cookie
 Maxibon
 It's-It Ice Cream
 Chipwich
 List of sandwiches

References

External links

Frozen desserts
Cookie sandwiches
Ice cream sandwiches